Sergey Layevskiy (born 3 March 1959) is a retired long jumper who represented the USSR and later Ukraine. He won a bronze medal at the 1985 European Indoor Championships and a silver medal at the 1986 European Championships.

Achievements

External links

1959 births
Living people
Ukrainian male long jumpers
Soviet male long jumpers
European Athletics Championships medalists
Goodwill Games medalists in athletics
World Athletics Championships athletes for the Soviet Union
Competitors at the 1986 Goodwill Games
Friendship Games medalists in athletics